Jérôme Nday Kanyangu Lukundwe (1929 – 13 June 2011) was the Roman Catholic bishop of the Roman Catholic Diocese of Kongolo, Democratic Republic of the Congo.

Ordained a priest in 1962, Nday Kanyangu Lukundwe was appointed bishop of the Kongolo Diocese in 1971; he retired in 2007.

See also

Notes

20th-century Roman Catholic bishops in the Democratic Republic of the Congo
1929 births
2011 deaths
21st-century Roman Catholic bishops in the Democratic Republic of the Congo
Roman Catholic bishops of Kongolo
21st-century Democratic Republic of the Congo people